Moods with Melodies is the fourth studio album by Himesh Reshammiya, produced by Reshammiya under the banner Himesh Reshammiya Melodies. It is the second album by Reshammiya in 2021 after Surroor 2021. Reshammiya announced the album on World Music Day, followed by the release of the first song on 23 June 2021.

Volume I
First song of the volume "Tere Bagairr", sung by Indian Idol 12 winner singer Pawandeep Rajan and first runner-up Arunita Kanjilal, was released on 23 June 2021. The song was praised by critics. Later a studio version was also released.

The second song "Pyaar Tumse", released on 27 August, was sung by Indian Idol 10 winner Salman Ali.

The third song, "Iss Pyar Ko", sung by Dev Negi, was released on 9 October 2021, later a reprised version sung by Negi was also released.

The song "Duaa Hai", a heart-breaking sad song, sung by Vineet Singh, featured Big Boss Season 15, winner TV actress Tejasswi Prakash.

The song "Designer Lehnga", a bridal anthem, was sung by Romaninan singer Iulia Vantur, her second song with Reshammiya.

Track listing
The first song of the album "Tere Bagairr" was sung by Pawandeep Rajan and Arunita Kanjilal, the music video featured Ishitha Chauhan and Parth.  

All songs were composed by Himesh Reshammiya, while lyrics were penned by Reshammiya, Sameer, Shabbir Ahmed, Sonia Kapoor and Manish S. Shukla.

Original

Music videos

Volume I

References 

2021 albums
Himesh Reshammiya albums
Himesh Reshammiya